Choerry (also known as JinSoul & Choerry) is the eighth single album from South Korean girl group Loona's pre-debut project. It was released digitally on July 28 and physically on July 31, 2017, by Blockberry Creative and distributed by Vlending Co., Ltd. It officially introduces the member Choerry and contains two tracks, Choerry's solo "Love Cherry Motion" and a duet with previous member JinSoul called "Puzzle".

Track listing

Charts

References

External links
 LOONA - Choerry at Vlending Co., Ltd. 
 
 Choerry at Melon 

2017 singles
Loona (group) albums
Single albums
Blockberry Creative singles